Platania is a surname. Notable people with the surname include:

Giacinto Platania (c. 1612-1691), Italian painter
John Platania (born 1948), American session musician, guitar player and record producer
Marco Platania (born 1973), Italian rugby union player
Pietro Platania (1828–1907), Italian composer and music teacher